Pringle Kennedy (1855 – 16 February 1925) was a British author and barrister. He wrote 2 books (during 1905–1925) for which he is best known:
 A History of the Great Moghuls (Or A History of the Badshahate of Delhi From 1398 AD To 1739), in 2 volumes, during 1905–1911.

 Arabian Society at the Time of Muhammad, published in 1926 by Thacker, Spink & Co. (Calcutta, India).
Pringle Kennedy has observed (Arabian Society at the Time of Muhammad, pp. 8–10, 18-21): "Muhammad was, to use a striking expression, the man of the hour."

In 1908, the young Bengali revolutionary, Khudiram Bose, an 18-year-old, was hanged for throwing a bomb at the carriage of Pringle Kennedy and killing his wife and daughter, Grace Kennedy.

Pringle Kennedy died on 16 February 1925.

Notes

References
 "New General Catalog of Old Books and Authors" (part for "Ke"), kingkong.demon.co.uk, 2008, webpage: AuthorAndBookInfo-Ke.

British people in colonial India
1855 births
1925 deaths
British barristers